Carlos Alberto Miguel Rodríguez (born 1 November 1990) is an Argentine footballer who plays as a midfielder. He is currently a free agent.

Career
Rodríguez's senior career began in 2009 with Primera B Nacional side Gimnasia y Esgrima. He made his professional debut on 19 September during a victory at home to San Martín, which preceded his departure from the club in June 2011. He subsequently joined Talleres of Torneo Argentino B, making forty-four appearances in just over a year with them. After Talleres, Rodríguez had spells with River Plate and Monterrico. In 2014, Rodríguez joined Altos Hornos Zapla in Torneo Federal A. Thirty-nine appearances across the 2014 and 2015 campaigns followed. 2016 saw Rodríguez make thirteen appearances for Deportivo Tabacal.

Career statistics
.

References

External links

1990 births
Living people
Sportspeople from Jujuy Province
Argentine footballers
Association football midfielders
Primera Nacional players
Torneo Argentino B players
Torneo Federal A players
Gimnasia y Esgrima de Jujuy footballers
Talleres de Perico footballers
Altos Hornos Zapla players